William Bullock may refer to:
William Bullock (actor) (c. 1657–c. 1740), English actor
William Bullock (collector) (c. 1773–1849), English traveller, artist, naturalist and antiquarian
William Bullock (cricketer) (1837–1904), English cricketer and journalist
William Bullock (inventor) (1813–1867), American inventor
William Henry Bullock (1927–2011), American Roman Catholic churchman
William Stephen Bullock (1865–1936), Canadian Baptist minister, businessman, and politician
William Thomas Bullock (1818–1879), English Anglican cleric and mission administrator

Fictional
William Bullock, a character in the TV series Deadwood

See also
William Bullock Clark (1860–1917), American geologist
William Bullock Ives (1841–1899), Canadian politician
William Bellinger Bulloch (1777–1852), American senator